Westfield Insurance, the primary subsidiary of Westfield Group, is a multi-line provider of business property and liability insurance, personal lines insurance (including auto, homeowner's and specialty), agribusiness insurance, and surety bonds.

History
Westfield began as Ohio Farmers Insurance Company in 1848, when a group of farmers joined forces to insure their properties.

Operations
Based in Westfield Center, Ohio, the company employs over 2,400 nationwide including 1,700 in their home office. It is the largest employer in Medina County. Westfield's products are distributed through a network of more than 1,000 independent insurance agents.

Headquarters
In addition to Westfield's home office, also located on the company grounds in Westfield Center are the Blair Center Conference Center, Westfield Bank, and a private hotel called Westfield Inn. The company also owns the Westfield Country Club, a 36-hole championship golf course that hosted the Junior PGA Championship until 2007.

Sponsorships
The company sponsors Straight "A" All-Stars with the Cleveland Cavaliers.

References

Companies based in Ohio
1848 establishments in Ohio
Financial services companies established in 1848